Flash is the self-titled debut studio album by British band Flash, released in February 1972 by Sovereign Records.

Background
Guitarist Peter Banks played with several bands before forming Flash, including The Nighthawks in 1963, The Devil's Disciples in 1964, The Syndicats in 1965 and then The Syn with Chris Squire on bass in 1965. He then joined Mabel Greer's Toyshop which would be the basis of Yes in 1966, again with Chris Squire, but briefly left to join a band called Neat Change and recorded a single, "I Lied to Aunty May"/"Sandman", with Peter Frampton playing guitar on side A while Banks played on side B. He then rejoined Mabel Greer's Toyshop, who became Yes. He left them after their second album, Time and a Word in 1970 to form Flash. Their bassist Ray Bennett played with another band prior to Flash called The Breed which included Bill Bruford on drums.

Reissue
A remastered version was issued in the US in 2003. Curiously, it was coupled with their third album "Out Of Our Hands". There appears to be no CD release to date of the band's second album, In the Can.

Track listing

Personnel 
Flash 
 Colin Carter – lead vocals, percussion
 Peter Banks – electric, acoustic and Spanish guitars, ARP synthesizer, backing vocals
 Ray Bennett – bass guitar, backing vocals; lead vocals and acoustic guitar on "Morning Haze"
 Mike Hough – drums, percussion, cymbals, voice

Additional personnel
Tony Kaye – ARP synthesizer, Hammond organ, piano

Production 
 Derek Lawrence – producer
 Martin Birch – engineer
 Flash – arrangements
 Maurice Tate – artwork
 Barry Wentzell – photography
 Hipgnosis – design, photography

References 

 Peter Banks - Bands Archives : http://www.peterbanks.net/archive/bands/

External links 
 Flash - Flash (1972) album to be listened as stream at Spotify.com
 Peter Banks Official Site : http://www.peterbanks.net/

1972 debut albums
Progressive rock albums by English artists